The Meeting Iberoamericano de Atletismo is an annual track and field meeting held at the Estadio Iberoamericano in Huelva, Spain since 2005 by the Royal Spanish Athletics Federation. It is typically held in mid-June.

The name of the meeting stems from the 2004 Ibero-American Championships in Athletics which was held at the same location and began the tradition of athletics at the stadium.

Records

Men

Women

References

RFEA Meeting website

Sport in Huelva
Recurring sporting events established in 2005
2005 establishments in Spain
European Athletic Association meetings
Annual track and field meetings
Athletics competitions in Spain